Game Show Network Radio is an American interactive internet radio game show that originally aired live on GSN.com from August 18, 2008, to November 13, 2009, hosted by husband and wife team Bob Goen and Marianne Curan. Other co-hosts filled in when one of them was unavailable. The four-hour program featured interactive games that listeners played to win cash and other prizes. The show aired from 1–5 P.M. Eastern every Monday through Friday afternoon.

Format and rules
GSN Radio was an internet radio game show in which home listeners are the contestants. Listeners anywhere in the world of age 21 or older could enter the contest by using the network's website or dialing a phone number, both of which were methods free of charge. If an entry was selected to participate in the game, the contestant was called on his telephone. The contestant then, either alone or with an opponent, played live on-air. A contestant may enter 10 times via telephone and 25 times on the internet per each 24-hour period. One week after the original 24-hour period in which an entry was submitted, that entry was cleared from the queue, and any entrants who wished to play more games are required to re-enter.

Some special games (occasionally referred to as Marquis Games) required that listeners register specifically for them on the GSN Radio website. For these games, a contestant may also enter 25 times each 24-hour period. These entries were not grouped with the entries of the regular games. All entries were cleared from the queue after the game was declared won (or over). Any entrants who wished to play another special game were required to re-enter.

Regardless of the method of entry, each entry had an equal chance of being selected. An entry did not necessarily guarantee an opportunity to play on the show.

Games

GSN Radio featured various minigames that were played throughout the program. The rewards for the games were usually prizes of $100 in cash, although some games had potential payouts of $200, $1,000 and $2,500. Imagination Games partnered with GSN to bring some of their original and licensed games to the radio format.

In a situation where a tie needed to be broken, a question related to the game was posed. The first contestant to yell out his name was given a chance to answer. If his answer was correct, he would be declared the winner. If he was incorrect, his opponent won by default.

During its 15-month run, 33 games were played in rotation on GSN Radio.

Other features
Outside of the traditional mini-game shows, GSN Radio often featured other segments.

Competitions
Since November 6, 2008, to the cancellation of the program, in addition to the regular on-air games, GSN Radio sponsored two other competitions offering cash.
{| class="wikitable"
|-
!width="150px" | Competition
!width="500px" | Instructions
|-
|Captain Ca$h
|Participants called the Captain Ca$h phone number and, in thirty seconds or less, left a message detailing why he thinks he should be awarded a cash prize or what he would do if the cash prize was awarded to him. On Monday through Thursday, three requests were played for the Captain. He chose one request each day to be a finalist. On Friday, the "Captain" announced on the program who, from the four finalists, he is awarding a cash prize to. Entrants could the Captain Ca$h phone number once a day, but multiple entries did not necessarily increase chances of selection.<ref>{{cite web|url=http://www.gsn.com/radio/rules_captaincash.html |title=Captain Ca$h" Official Rules |access-date=2008-11-22 |url-status=dead |archive-url=https://web.archive.org/web/20090413172922/http://www.gsn.com/radio/rules_captaincash.html |archive-date=April 13, 2009 }}</ref>
|-
|My Game Show Idea
|Participants had to log on to the GSN Radio website and, using 2500 words or less, submit his own game show concept he would like to see played. At the end of the contest period, one concept was chosen. The winner received $500 in cash and has his game played in rotation on GSN Radio.  The contest concluded on January 26, 2009, with the game "Film Degrees of Separation", submitted by Eric in New Jersey, declared the winner.
|}

Guest appearances
Often in conjunction with games on the show, celebrity participants appeared in the program. Such instances include Jeopardy! champion Ken Jennings guesting on October 31, 2008, to play a special trivia challenge and Howie Mandel appearing on December 5, 2008, to play a special version of Would You Rather?. Other actors appeared to ask questions in the Ultimate Trivia game related to their shows, such as John O'Hurley asking questions about Seinfeld as J. Peterman and Kate Flannery asking questions about The Office.

Syndication and The Best of GSN Radio
When GSN Radio was not live, The Best of GSN Radio was streamed on the show's website. The program continuously featured repeat airings of past games once played live. This program was also aired on terrestrial radio stations.

Condensed versions of The Best of GSN Radio were syndicated to stations in North America for airings on Saturdays and Sundays. The Best Of was also available for syndication to dozens of other stations through a division of Radio America.

See also
 GSN Live PlayMania''

Notes and references

External links
 The Best of GSN Radio stream 

Internet radio in the United States
Game Show Network original programming